Island Creek is a  long 2nd order tributary to the Trent River in Jones County, North Carolina.

Course
Island Creek rises about 2 miles east of Pollocksville, North Carolina in Croatan National Forest and then flows northerly to join the Trent River at River Bend, North Carolina.

Watershed
Island Creek drains  of area, receives about 54.7 in/year of precipitation, has a wetness index of 565.10, and is about 45% forested.

See also
List of rivers of North Carolina

References

Rivers of North Carolina
Rivers of Jones County, North Carolina